The DTA Voyageur is a French ultralight trike, designed by Jean-Michel Dizier and produced by DTA sarl of Montélimar. The aircraft is supplied complete and ready-to-fly.

Design and development
The Voyageur is intended as a bush aircraft for flying from unprepared surfaces and as such mounts heavy duty landing gear, tundra tires and lacks a cockpit fairing and a front wing strut.

It features a cable-braced hang glider-style high-wing, weight-shift controls, a two-seats-in-tandem open cockpit, tricycle landing gear without wheel pants and a single engine in pusher configuration.

The aircraft is made from bolted-together aluminum tubing, with its double surface wing covered in Dacron sailcloth. The powerplant is a twin cylinder, liquid-cooled, two-stroke, dual-ignition  Rotax 582 engine or the four cylinder, air and liquid-cooled, four-stroke, dual-ignition  Rotax 912S engine.

A number of different wings can be fitted to the basic carriage, including the DTA Dynamic 450, the DTA Dynamic 15/430 DTA Magic and DTA Diva.

The Voyageur II model is accepted as a light-sport aircraft in the United States.

Variants
Voyageur 582 Dynamic 15
Model with a  Rotax 582 engine and DTA Dynamic 15 wing.
Voyageur 912 S Dynamic 450
Model with a  Rotax 912S engine and DTA Dynamic 450 wing.
Voyageur II 582 Dynamic 15/430
Improved model with a  Rotax 582 engine and DTA Dynamic 15/430 wing.
Voyageur II 912 S Dynamic 450
 Improved model with a  Rotax 912S engine and DTA Dynamic 450 wing.

Specifications (Voyageur II 912 S Dynamic 450)

References

External links

Voyageur
1990s French sport aircraft
1990s French ultralight aircraft
Single-engined pusher aircraft
Ultralight trikes
High-wing aircraft